Drum is a maxi yacht owned by Scottish car sales group Arnold Clark Automobiles, formerly co-owned by lead singer of Duran Duran Simon Le Bon who was rescued from the vessel while competing in 1985 Fastnet Race.

Design
Drum was designed by Ireland-based boat designer Ron Holland and built initially in Plymouth Devon, and completed on The Isle of Wight  . Drum was purpose-designed and built to be sailed in the Whitbread Round the World Race. The vessel was purchased by Simon Le Bon and the Berrow brothers.

Career

Fastnet, 1985
Drum competed in the 1985 Fastnet Race. It was one of the favourites to win the race, but the boat lost its keel because the keel supplier failed to heat treat the structure holding the keel to the yacht as specified by the designer, a necessary step after welding aluminum. When the structure failed, Drum capsized. Its crew were all rescued. Le Bon had not insured the vessel.

1985–86 Whitbread
Drum was re-fitted and competed in the 1985–86 Whitbread Round the World Race.

Current status
 Drum is owned by Scottish businessman Arnold Clark, who purchased the yacht in the late 1980s. In 1988 Drum was again accorded media attention when it was involved in a collision with a Royal Navy submarine, around 5 miles off the Mull of Kintyre.

As of 2020, Drum is no longer sailing and her historical relevance could secure her a permanent berth in a museum.

References

1980s sailing yachts
Duran Duran
Individual sailing vessels
Maxi yachts
Sailing yachts built in Finland
Sailboat type designs by Ron Holland
Sailing yachts of the United Kingdom
Volvo Ocean Race yachts
Fastnet Race yachts